Van der Heijden is a Dutch toponymic surname meaning "from the heath" (modern Dutch heide). Variant spellings are Van der Heijde, Van der Heyden, “VanDerHeyden” and concatenated forms. The surnames Van der Heide, Verheijen and Verheyen have the same origin. Notable people with the surname include:

Van der Heijden
A. F. Th. van der Heijden (born 1951), Dutch writer
Andrew van der Heijden (born 1984), New Zealand rugby player
Dennis van der Heijden (born 1997), Dutch footballer
Frans Jozef van der Heijden (1938–2016), Dutch politician
Harold van der Heijden (born 1960), Dutch chess composer
Hein van der Heijden (born 1958), Dutch actor
Jan-Arie van der Heijden (born 1988), Dutch footballer
Jorien van der Heijden (born 1985), Dutch esports host
 (1826–1900), Dutch general
Laura van der Heijden (born 1990), Dutch handball player
Laura van der Heijden (born 1997), British musician
Michael van der Heijden (born 1982), Dutch footballer
Michiel van der Heijden (born 1992), Dutch cyclist
Milou van der Heijden (born 1990), Dutch squash player
Patrick van der Heijden (born 1992), Brazilian field hockey player
Paul F. van der Heijden (born 1949), Dutch legal scholar
Yuri van der Heijden (born 1990), Brazilian field hockey player

Vanderheijden
Grietje Vanderheijden (born 1978), Belgian actress

Van der Heijde
Amber van der Heijde (born 1988), Dutch footballer

Van der Heyde
Nikolai van der Heyde (born 1936), Dutch film director and screenwriter

Van der Heyden
Abraham van der Heyden (1597-1678), Dutch Calvinist minister and controversialist
Gaspard van der Heyden (1496-1549), Flemish goldsmith, engraver, master printer and builder of precision astronomical instruments
Jacob van der Heyden (1573–1645), Flemish Baroque painter, sculptor and engraver
Jan van der Heyden (1637-1712), Dutch painter, draughtsman, printmaker, and inventor
Jasper Van Der Heyden (born 1995), Belgian footballer
 (1926–2011), Dutch film director and screenwriter
Jelle van der Heyden (born 1995), Dutch footballer
Ludo Van der Heyden, Belgian-American management scholar
Peter Van Der Heyden (born 1976), Belgian professional football player
Pieter van der Heyden (c.1530–1572), Flemish printmaker
Stéphane Van Der Heyden (born 1969), Belgian professional football player
Todd van der Heyden (born 1973), Canadian television reporter and news anchor

Vanderheyden
Jan Vanderheyden (1890–1961), Belgian comedy film producer and director
JCJ Vanderheyden (1928-2012), Dutch painter and photographer
Sandra Vander-Heyden (born 1964), American field hockey player

See also
 Heyden (disambiguation)
 Van der Heide
 Van Derheyden House
 Vanderheyden

References

Dutch-language surnames
Surnames of Dutch origin
Dutch toponymic surnames